Sid Burston is an American actor who has performed in over forty stage plays and fourteen national tours. He has played numerous lead and supporting roles in film and television. Burston release his debut gospel album Get Thee Behind Me in 1997.

Filmography

Film
I Am John Brown (????)
Naptown (pre-production) (2018)
The Job Interview (2017)
CainAbel (2017)
Opus of an Angel (2016)
Grim Weaver (2016)
Maul Dogs (2015)
Miles Away (2015)
Original Stereotype (2014)
That Guy: Lost Undercover (2014)
Alleged Gangster (2013)
Attack on Maiduguri (2012)
Exit Strategy (2012) 
Road 2 Damascus (2011)
Trapped: Haitian Nights (2010)
JC in tha Hood (2008)
Eye See Me (2007)
Reunion (2006) 
Random Acts of Violence (2002)
Streetwise (1998)

Television
The Restaurant (2015)
Eros.Emmanuel and Me (2012)
Get Thee Behind Me (2010-2011)
Poetri-N-Motion (2009)
Mutiny (1999)
Columbo (1998)

References

External links

Sid Burston at Backstage

African-American male actors
American male television actors
American male film actors
American male musical theatre actors
American male stage actors
American gospel singers
Urban contemporary gospel musicians
20th-century American male actors
21st-century American male actors
Living people
20th-century African-American male singers
1959 births
21st-century African-American people